Archeo is a monthly archeology magazine based in Rome, Italy. The magazine was first published in March 1985. It features articles on archaeological news. As of 2011, Andreas Steiner was the editor of the magazine.

See also
 List of magazines in Italy

References

External links
 
 WorldCat record

1985 establishments in Italy
Archaeology magazines
Cultural magazines
Italian-language magazines
Magazines established in 1985
Magazines published in Rome
Monthly magazines published in Italy